Mattavilasa Prahasana (Devanagari:मत्तविलासप्रहसन), is a short one-act Sanskrit play. It is one of the two great one act plays written by Pallava King Mahendravarman I (571– 630CE) in the beginning of the seventh century in Tamil Nadu.

Mattavilasa Prahasana is a satire that pokes fun at the peculiar aspects of the heretic Kapalika and Pasupata Saivite sects, Buddhists and Jainism.  The setting of the play is Kanchipuram, the capital city of the Pallava kingdom in the seventh century.  The play revolves around the drunken antics of a Kapalika mendicant, Satyasoma, his woman, Devasoma, and the loss and recovery of their skull-bowl.  The cast of characters consists of Kapali or Satysoma, an unorthodox Saivite mendicant, Devasoma, Satysoma’s female partner, a Buddhist Monk, whose name is Nagasena, Pasupata, a member of another unorthodox Saivite order and a Madman.  The act describes a  dispute between a drunken Kapali and the Buddhist monk. The inebriated Kapali suspects the Buddhist monk of stealing his begging bowl made from a skull, but after a drawn-out argument it is found to have been taken away by a dog.

Synopsis
Mattavilasa Prahasana opens with the entering of two drunken Kapalikas, Satyasoma and his woman, Devasoma.  Full of drunken antics, they stumble from tavern to tavern searching for more alcohol.  The Kapalikas are told to be followers of a heretic Saivite sect whose rites included drinking, wild dancing and singing, and ritual intercourse with their partners. As Satysoma asks for more alms, he realizes that he has lost his sacred skull-bowl. Devasoma suggests that he might have left it at the tavern they previously visited.  To their dismay, it was not there. Satyasoma suspects that either a dog or a Buddhist monk has taken it.

A  Buddhist monk, Nagasena, enters the stage and the Kapalika suggests that he is the culprit-the one who has stolen the skull-bowl.  Satyasoma criticizes the Buddhist monk by saying that he steals, lies, and desires liquor, meat and women even though his religion prohibits it.  As for Buddhism itself, the Kapali accuses it of stealing ideas from the Mahabharata and the Vedanta.  Satyasoma argues with the monk who denies the accusations and the dispute eventually leads to a physical brawl.  As the fighting escalates, another mendicant, a Pasupata acquaintance of Satyasoma's, enters and mediates the situation.  The drawn-out argument continues until the Buddhist monk, in despair, gives his begging bowl to a delusional Satyasoma.

The Madman enters the stage and in his hand is Satyasoma's real skull-bowl.  The madman recovered the bowl from a dog and the skull-bowl is finally returned to its delighted, rightful owner.  There is a happy resolution and all characters leave in an amicable fashion.

Interpretations
There was a strong revivalist movement of Hinduism in South India during the seventh century and King Mahendra supported this revivalism.  He excavated temples in mountains, a majority of which were dedicated to Siva.  It is within this atmosphere of this enlightenment when Mahendra’s play, Mattavilasa Prahasana, had its greatest effect.

It is widely held that Mahendra’s play is a satire of the degenerate sects of his day.  For example, both the Kapalika and Pasupata sects must have been considered peculiar during Mahendra’s reign, and the king satirizes them in his play. The Kapalikas embodied a serious, yet suspect, religious concept:  Tantrism where religious enlightenment is attained through unorthodox rituals. Some of these notorious rituals were Madya (liquor) and Maithuna (ritual intercourse).  Meanwhile, these rituals are satirically echoed by Nagasena, the Buddhist monk, who wonders why Buddhism disallows liquor and women.  Jainism isn’t spared from Mahendra’s satirical pen as both Devasoma and Satyasoma describe Jains as heretics.

While the play does have a satirical plot, it also provides an interesting look into the life at Kanchipuram during the seventh century.  There are references to the sounds of drums, young ladies and various flower shops.  The King points to the festive climate within taverns and to the corrupted courts of Kanchi where officials were sometimes bribed.  There is also mention of temple towers.

Satyasoma accuses the Buddha of stealing ideas from the Vedanta and Mahabharata.  This remark has a bearing on the age of the Mahabharata battle and its epic story.

Adaptations
A 2003 dance theatre adaptation of Mattavilasa Prahasanam was produced and presented by SANGALPAM. There was a national United Kingdom tour between 2003-2004. Directed by Stella Uppal-Subbiah, the play was edited to highlight bharatanatyam, and received great reviews.

Translations

 Mattavilasa Prahasana The Farce of Drunken Sport (1981)  by Michael Lockwood and A. Vishnu Bhat
 Drunken Games (2001) by David Lorenzen, edited by David Gordon White
 The Farce of Drunken Sport (2003) by Stella Uppal-Subbiah [Theatrical Adaptation]
 Mattavilasa Prahasana (1936) by N.P. Unni and Narayanan Parameswaran
 Mahendravikrama Varmana (1998) by Urmibhushna Gupta
 High Spirits (1990, 1992) by Rahul Bonner

See also
Kapalika
Kutiyattam

References

Further reading 

 Heras, Rev Henry. Studies in Pallava History. Madras: B.G Paul and Company, 1933.
 Chākyār, Māni Mādhava. Mattavilāsam. Kerala, 1968
 Chākyār, Māni Mādhava. Nātyakalpadrumam. New Delhi:Sangeet Natak Akademi, 1975
 Unni, NP. Mattavilasa on the Kutiyattam Stage Mattavilasam. New Delhi: Nag Publishers, 1997.
 Unni, NP.Journal of Kerala Studies. Vol I, No I. New Delhi: Trivandrum, 1973.
 Unni, NP. "Mattavilasa prahasana of Mahendravikramavarman". Madras: College Book House, 1979.
 Guptā, Urmibhūshṇa. "Mahendravikrama Varmana'.  Nayī Dillī : Vāṇī Prakāśana, 1998.
 Lockwood, M and AV Bhat. The Farce of Drunken Sport. Tambaram, Madras: MCC,  1981.
 Barnett, Lionel D. Matta-vilasa, a farce by Mahendravikrama-Varman. London: 1930.
 Zarilli, P. The Play and its Adaptation as South Asian Dance-Theatre 2003. Web. 13 July 2009 <https://web.archive.org/web/20081202064015/http://www.phillipzarrilli.com/productions/drunkenmonk/index.html>.
 Fentress, Roy Kenneth. "The rock-cut shrines of Pallava Mahendravarman I". University of California, Berkeley:  University Press,  1981.
 Varma, Mahendra. "Mattavilasaprahasana. English and Sanscrit". Dilli: Naga Prakasaka, 1998.
 Jouveau-Dubreuil, Gabriel. "Conjeevaram inscription of Mahêndravarman I". St. Joseph's Industrial School Press, 1919.
 Aiyangar, Sakkottai K. Early History of Vaishnavism in South India. London: Oxford University Press, 1920.

External links
http://www.britannica.com/EBchecked/topic/358161/Mahendravarman-I
http://www.enotes.com/mahendravarman-salem/mahendravarman
http://ignca.nic.in/sanskrit/matta_vilasa_prahasanam.pdf

Sanskrit plays
Indian plays
Ancient Indian literature